Zelda is an unincorporated community in Lawrence County, Kentucky, United States.

Notes

Unincorporated communities in Lawrence County, Kentucky
Unincorporated communities in Kentucky